The Food Hygiene Rating (Wales) Act 2013 anaw 2  is an Act of the National Assembly for Wales to make food hygiene ratings mandatory. The ratings are also to be made public through use of a Food Hygiene Sticker. Food Hygiene Ratings are available on the Food Standards Agency website.

References

Acts of the National Assembly for Wales
2013 in British law
2013 in Wales
2013 in British politics
Food policy in the United Kingdom
Food safety in the United Kingdom